Nicoleta-Elena Dincă (born 2 July 1988) is a Romanian handballer Gloria Bistrița and the Romanian national team.

Results
EHF Challenge Cup:                       
Finalist: 2007
Youth European Championship:
Silver Medallist 2005
Youth World Championship:
Bronze Medallist 2006
European Junior Championship:
Bronze Medallist 2007

References

External links

1982 births
Living people
Sportspeople from Slatina, Romania
Romanian female handball players